The 2022 Goodyear 400 was a NASCAR Cup Series race held on May 8, 2022, at Darlington Raceway in Darlington, South Carolina. Contested over 293 laps on the  egg-shaped oval, it was the 12th race of the 2022 NASCAR Cup Series season. It was the 52nd running of the event

Report

Background

Darlington Raceway is a race track built for NASCAR racing located near Darlington, South Carolina. It is nicknamed "The Lady in Black" and "The Track Too Tough to Tame" by many NASCAR fans and drivers and advertised as "A NASCAR Tradition." It is of a unique, somewhat egg-shaped design, an oval with the ends of very different configurations, a condition which supposedly arose from the proximity of one end of the track to a minnow pond the owner refused to relocate. This situation makes it very challenging for the crews to set up their cars' handling in a way that is effective at both ends.

On December 11, 2020, Darlington Raceway announced its highly popular NASCAR Throwback weekend would move to the new May 7–9 weekend, effectively making a lineal swap of the two race meetings at the track.

Entry list
 (R) denotes rookie driver.
 (i) denotes driver who are ineligible for series driver points.

Practice

Practice results

Qualifying

Qualifying results

Race

Stage Results

Stage One
Laps: 90

Stage Two
Laps: 95

Final Stage Results

Stage Three
Laps: 108

Race statistics
 Lead changes: 24 among 13 different drivers
 Cautions/Laps: 9 for 47
 Red flags: 0
 Time of race: 3 hours, 21 minutes and 32 seconds
 Average speed:

Media

Television
The race was carried by FS1 in the United States. Mike Joy and Clint Bowyer called the race from the broadcast booth.  Richard Petty, Bobby Labonte, and Bill Elliott swapped through the booth in stage 1, 2, and 3. Jamie Little and Regan Smith handled pit road for the television side. Larry McReynolds provided insight from the Fox Sports studio in Charlotte.

Radio
MRN had the radio call for the race, which was also simulcast on Sirius XM NASCAR Radio.

Standings after the race

Drivers' Championship standings

Manufacturers' Championship standings

Note: Only the first 16 positions are included for the driver standings.
. – Driver has clinched a position in the NASCAR Cup Series playoffs.

Notes

References

Goodyear 400
Goodyear 400
NASCAR races at Darlington Raceway
Goodyear 400